Nia is a genus of fungi in the family Niaceae. The genus contains three species adapted to a marine environment. All are wood-rotting fungi, producing small, gasteroid basidiocarps (fruit bodies) on driftwood, submerged timber, mangrove wood, and similar substrates. The type species, Nia vibrissa, is widespread in temperate and tropical seas.

References

Niaceae
Agaricales genera